Nagretdinovo (Nähretdin) is a rural locality (a village) in Podlubovsky Selsoviet, Karaidelsky District, Bashkortostan, Russia. The population was 155 as of 2010. There are 3 streets.

Geography 
Nagretdinovo is located 59 km southwest of Karaidel (the district's administrative centre) by road. Urazayevo is the nearest rural locality.

References 

Rural localities in Karaidelsky District